Cullberg Ballet is a Swedish contemporary dance company.

It was founded by the modern dancer and pioneer choreographer Birgit Cullberg in 1967, who brought it to fame. After Cullberg's retirement in 1985 the company was until 1993 run by her son, the popular Swedish dancer, choreographer and stage director Mats Ek.

From 2003 Cullbergbaletten was managed by choreographer Johan Inger and from 2009 to 2013 Anna Grip held the position as artistic director. From 2014 to 2022, Gabriel Smeets was the artistic director of the ballet.

Cullberg Ballet is part of Riksteatern and tours both nationally and internationally.

References

Further reading

External links
 

Dance companies in Sweden
Contemporary dance companies